Parliamentary elections were held in Sudan between 2 and 11 February 1978. The People's Assembly had been increased from 250 to 304 seats, of which 274 were elected and 30 were appointed by President Gaafar Nimeiry.

At the time, the Sudanese Socialist Union was the sole legal party, and it won all 274 seats.

Results

References

1978 in Sudan
Elections in Sudan
One-party elections
Sudan
National Legislature (Sudan)
Election and referendum articles with incomplete results